The Lake Erie League (LEL) is an Ohio High School Athletic Association (OHSAA) sports conference that mainly includes schools in the greater Cleveland, Ohio area.

Members

In April 2022, Cleveland Heights and Shaker Heights were voted in to join the Greater Cleveland Conference, which they will become members of for the 2023-24 school year.

Former members
 Elyria Pioneers (192354, to Buckeye Conference. 19972003, to Pioneer)
 Lakewood Rangers (19232007, to Northeast Ohio)
 Lorain Steelmen (192354, to Buckeye Conference)
 Rocky River Pirates (1923–37, to Southwestern)
 Parma Redmen (19512003, to Pioneer)
 Lyndhurst Brush Arcs (1962–75, to Greater Cleveland)
 Parma Heights Valley Forge Patriots (19622003, to Pioneer)
 Garfield Heights Bulldogs (19682007, to Northeast Ohio [Football 196886, 19932007])
 Parma Normandy Invaders (19682003, to Pioneer)
 Berea Braves (197579, to Pioneer)
 Middleburg Heights Midpark Meteors (197579, to Pioneer)
 Mentor Cardinals (19932011, to Northeast Ohio)
 Euclid Panthers (19982015, to Greater Cleveland)
 Lorain Admiral King Admirals (200210, consolidated into Lorain)
 Lorain Southview Saints (200210, consolidated into Lorain)
 Warren Warren G. Harding Raiders (20102013, to All-American, football through 2014 season)
 Cleveland Heights Lutheran East Falcons (20172019)

See also
 Ohio High School Athletic Conferences

References

Ohio high school sports conferences